The following is a summary of significant earthquakes during the 21st century. 
In terms of fatalities, the 2004 Indian Ocean earthquake was the most destructive event with around 227,898 fatalities, followed by the 2010 Haiti earthquake with about 160,000 fatalities, the 2008 Sichuan earthquake with 87,587 fatalities, the 2005 Kashmir earthquake with 87,351 fatalities, and the 2023 Turkey–Syria earthquake with at least 55,190 fatalities.

The 2011 Tōhoku earthquake and tsunami became the costliest natural disaster, resulting in approximately $360 billion in property damage at the time, followed by the 2008 Sichuan earthquake and the 2023 Turkey–Syria earthquake, which resulted in $150 billion and $105.1 billion in damage, respectively.

List of deadliest earthquakes

 Note: At least 1,000+ fatalities

List of largest earthquakes by magnitude

 Note: At least 8.5+ magnitude

List of costliest earthquakes

Note:This only ranks immediate costs, for example, nuclear meltdown and climate and fossil fuel costs, as well as other ongoing costs from quakes are not included.

Deadliest earthquakes by year
These are the deadliest earthquakes per year

Largest earthquakes by year
These are the largest earthquakes by magnitude per year

Lists of earthquakes by decade
 List of earthquakes 2001–2010
 List of earthquakes 2011–2020
 List of earthquakes 2021–2030

Gallery

See also
 
 Lists of 20th-century earthquakes
 List of historical earthquakes
 Lists of earthquakes

Notes

References

Sources

External links
 IRIS Seismic Monitor
 USGS list of current earthquakes
 EMSC – Recent European and World earthquakes

Lists of 21st-century disasters
Seismic history

Seismology related lists